Zhivko Atanasov (born 3 February 1991) is a Bulgarian professional footballer who plays as a centre back for Cherno More Varna.

Career
Atanasov began his career with Levski Sofia.

In the winter of 2012, Atanasov impressed Cherno More manager Stefan Genov as a trialist during Cherno More's training camp in Turkey. On 17 February 2012, he signed a two-and-a-half-year contract. Atanasov made his debut on 4 March, starting against Levski Sofia at Georgi Asparuhov Stadium in an A Group fixture, playing the full 90 minutes at centre-back in a 2–1 defeat. He scored his first Cherno More goal on 18 April, opening the scoring in a 7–1 home win over Kaliakra Kavarna.

When Aleksandar Aleksandrov was transferred in January 2014, Atanasov formed a partnership with Kiril Kotev in the centre of defence and has become an established first team player.

On 16 January 2020 he signed a 1.5-year contract with Serie C side Catanzaro.

On 4 August 2020, Atanasov returned to his boyhood club Levski Sofia on a 2-year deal.

Family
Atanasov's mother, Yordanka Donkova, is a former hurdling athlete notable for winning an Olympic gold medal and bronze medal as well as 9 medals at European indoor and outdoor championships.

Honours

Club 
Cherno More
 Bulgarian Cup: 2014–15

References

External links

1991 births
Living people
Bulgarian footballers
Bulgaria youth international footballers
Association football central defenders
FC Septemvri Simitli players
PFC Cherno More Varna players
PFC Slavia Sofia players
S.S. Juve Stabia players
U.S. Viterbese 1908 players
U.S. Catanzaro 1929 players
PFC Levski Sofia players
First Professional Football League (Bulgaria) players
Serie C players
Bulgarian expatriate footballers
Expatriate footballers in Italy
People from Varna Province